The list of shipwrecks in December 1918 includes ships sunk, foundered, grounded, or otherwise lost during December 1918.

1 December

2 December

3 December

4 December

5 December

6 December

7 December

8 December

9 December

10 December

11 December

12 December

13 December

15 December

16 December

17 December

=19 December

20 December

21 December

24 December

26 December

27 December

28 December

29 December

30 December

31 December

Unknown date

References

1918-12
 12